Organophosphorus acid anhydrolase (OPAA) is an enzyme that been shown to be particularly effective in detoxifying organophosphorus-containing compounds, such as deadly nerve gas used in chemical warfare. The enzyme is found in a diverse range of organisms, including protozoa, squid and clams, mammals, and soil bacteria. A highly active form of the enzyme is typically isolated from the marine bacteria Alteromonas undina for laboratory study.  This form is both halophilic and thermophilic, making it particularly useful for detoxification applications. A slightly less active variant of OPAA has also been isolated in mung beans and slime mold duckweed.

Enzyme mechanism

Although the exact mechanism of OPAA’s nerve-agent detoxification is unclear, researchers have deduced that the basic reaction follows a general base mechanism with a simple in-line displacement of fluoride at the phosphorus center using an activated water molecule, as seen in Figure 1.

OPAA activity is enhanced by reducing agents such as dithiothreitol (DTT) and beta-mercaptoethanol. OPAA is also catalytically active over a wide pH range between 6.5 and 9.5 and temperature range between 10 and 65 °C, and is stimulated by manganese.

Enzyme structure

OPAA is a single polypeptide composed of 517 amino acids, with a molecular weight of 58 kDa. The three-dimensional crystal structure of OPAA is a trimer, as seen in Figure 2. The enzyme has a 22% amino acid homology with human prolidase and a 30% homology to E. coli aminopeptidase P.

The enzyme is unstable under harsh conditions, losing its activity in the presence of organic solvents, at elevated temperature, and over long-term storage. Unprotected OPAA enzymes are also vulnerable to inhibition from other enzymes.

Biological function
The native biological role of OPAAs remains unknown.  Its similarity to prolidase has led some researchers to theorize that it may be involved in cellular dipeptide metabolism, although conclusions about its true function remains elusive.

Industrial relevance

OPAA’s susbstrate-specificity to organophosphorus-containing compounds, especially fluoride-containing G-type nerve agents such as sarin, cyclosarin, tabun, and soman, have drawn the interest of the U.S. Army . That attention has resulted in the establishment of a biodegradation program in search of safe and effective means of disposal for chemical weapons in the 1980s; the program is currently called the Advanced Catalytic Enzyme System (ACES).

References

Enzymes
Enzymes of known structure